Filip Gustavsson (born 7 June 1998) is a Swedish professional ice hockey goaltender for the  Minnesota Wild of the National Hockey League (NHL). He has previously played with the Luleå HF organization in the Swedish Hockey League, as well as the Ottawa Senators. Gustavsson was drafted 55th overall by the Pittsburgh Penguins in the 2016 NHL Entry Draft.

Playing career
Gustavsson made his Swedish Hockey League (SHL) debut playing with Luleå HF during the 2015–16 SHL season, on 14 November 2015.

Gustavsson was selected in the second round, 55th overall by the Pittsburgh Penguins during the 2016 NHL Entry Draft. On 16 June 2017, Gustavsson was signed to a three-year, entry-level contract by the Penguins. He would continue his development on loan in Sweden with Luleå HF through the 2017–18 season.

On 23 February 2018, the Penguins traded Gustavsson to the Ottawa Senators (alongside Ian Cole, a 2018 first-round pick, and a 2019 third-round pick) in exchange for Derick Brassard. On 23 March 2018, Gustavsson was assigned to the Senators American Hockey League (AHL) affiliate, the Belleville Senators, after the conclusion of the SHL season. With the 2020–21 season delayed due to the COVID-19 pandemic, Gustavsson was loaned to Södertälje SK of HockeyAllsvenskan. He went 11–7–0 in 19 appearances before returning to the Senators. On 17 March 2021, Gustavsson made his NHL debut. He entered in relief of Joey Daccord, who departed the game with an injury. Gustavsson stopped all eight shots faced in the 3–2 shootout loss to the Vancouver Canucks. He made his first career start on 22 March, stopping 35 shots in a 2–1 win over the Calgary Flames. The victory was the first of his NHL career. In the 2021–22 season Gustavsson played in 18 games with Ottawa, starting 16 of them, compiling a record of 5–12–1. He also played in 20 games with Belleville.

On 12 July 2022, Gustavsson was traded by the Senators to the Minnesota Wild in exchange for goaltender Cam Talbot.

Career statistics

Regular season and playoffs

References

External links
 

1998 births
Living people
Belleville Senators players
Brampton Beast players
Luleå HF players
Minnesota Wild players
Ottawa Senators players
People from Skellefteå Municipality
Pittsburgh Penguins draft picks
Södertälje SK players
Swedish ice hockey goaltenders
Sportspeople from Västerbotten County